Oldhead Wood Nature Reserve is a national nature reserve of approximately  located on Clew Bay, near Louisburgh, County Mayo, Ireland. It is managed by the Irish National Parks & Wildlife Service, part of the Department of Arts, Heritage and the Gaeltacht.

Features
Oldhead Wood was legally protected as a national nature reserve by the Irish government in 1984. It is also a Special Area of Conservation under the EU Habitats Directive.

The name Oldhead or Old Head also refers to the townland in which the nature reserve is located. The woodlands consist of deciduous trees which have been used and changed by human usage. Its position on Clew Bay gives the area a humid climate, with diverse bryophyte flora. It is a semi-natural woodland with the most prominent tree species being oak, with some willow, birch and rowan. There is also some beech and sycamore that were introduced.

References

Geography of County Mayo
Forests and woodlands of the Republic of Ireland
Nature reserves in the Republic of Ireland
Tourist attractions in County Mayo
Special Areas of Conservation in the Republic of Ireland